Sneakiepeeks is a situation comedy series broadcast on BBC Radio 4 between  2009 and 2010. It was written by Harry Venning and Neil Brand and produced by Katie Tyrell.

Situation
The series concerns "Beagle Team", an undercover surveillance unit comprising Bill Cooper (Richard Lumsden), who harbours unrequited passion for team leader Sharla Jasumani  (Nina Conti), and the ex-criminal Mark Walker (Daniel Kaluuya).  Lumsden and Conti also appear in Venning's somewhat more well-known comedy "Clare in the Community".

The typical mission involves the team attempting to listen in on conversations in places such as hotels, houses, and yachts.   The mission is usually interrupted by such distractions as police trying to get their parked vehicle to move on, fallout from Mark's attempts to make money on the side, unexpected numbers of customers for the food van they are using as a cover, and occasional rogue agents from one side or the other.

Characters
 Bill Cooper (Richard Lumsden), the team's technician.  His "mission log", spoken aloud, acts as introduction and linkage for the plot, and tends to veer into expressions of his yearning for Sharla, which he then expunges with "delete delete delete!".
 Sharla Jasumani  (Nina Conti), team leader.  Sharla has a strong Northern Ireland accent and a pugnacious attitude.  She has unresolved issues with her superiors in the agency and is fiercely competitive with the other surveillance teams.  The head of the department, codenamed "Hunter", is her 'uncle'.  In one episode she starts an unauthorised operation to spy on her lover.
 Mark Walker (Daniel Kaluuya), a former criminal forced to work with the agency.  He is a streetwise Londoner who excels in talking his way out of situations.  He also likes to make money on the side.  When the team uses a lunch van as a cover, his culinary efforts attract too much attention, and he begins to dream of a mention in a gourmet magazine.

Episode list

Series 1

External links

BBC Radio comedy programmes
2009 radio programme debuts
BBC Radio 4 programmes